Dermot Christopher Ahern (born 20 April 1955) is an Irish former Fianna Fáil politician who served as Minister for Justice and Law Reform from 2008 to 2011, Minister for Foreign Affairs from 2004 to 2008, Minister for Communications, Marine and Natural Resources from 2002 to 2004, Minister for Social, Community and Family Affairs from 1997 to 2002 and Government Chief Whip and Minister of State at the Department of Defence from 1991 to 1992. He served as a Teachta Dála (TD) for the Louth constituency from 1987 to 2011.

Early and private life
Ahern was born in Dundalk, County Louth, in 1955. He was educated at the Marist College in Dundalk and later attended University College Dublin. Afterwards he studied at the Law Society of Ireland and was admitted as a solicitor.

Ahern currently lives in Blackrock near Dundalk, with his wife and their two children. His pastimes include playing golf and windsurfing. He is a former Ulster windsurfing champion. Ahern is a former chairman of Rock Celtic soccer club and was also treasurer of Dundalk F.C. Supporter's Club.

Early political career
Ahern was born into a family that had no association with party politics. He became involved in politics at a young age and became a member of Louth County Council in 1979 as a Fianna Fáil representative. He served on that authority until 1991. Ahern was elected to Dáil Éireann at the 1987 general election. The following year he was appointed assistant government chief whip by Taoiseach Charles Haughey.

Three years later in 1991, the Minister for Finance, Albert Reynolds, failed in his attempt to oust Haughey as leader. Ahern, who supported Haughey, was rewarded with the post of Minister of State at the Department of the Taoiseach with special responsibility as Government Chief Whip and Minister of State at the Department of Defence. In February 1992, Haughey was forced to resign and Albert Reynolds became party leader and Taoiseach. Ahern became a backbencher for the entire duration of the Fianna Fáil-Labour Party government.

In late 1994, Bertie Ahern (no relation) succeeded Albert Reynolds as leader of Fianna Fáil. Ahern once again returned to the senior ranks of the party becoming chief whip. In 1997, he was sent to London to check out rumours that another senior party member, Ray Burke, had received a payment from Joseph Murphy. The claim was denied and Burke was appointed Minister for Foreign Affairs two days later following the return to power of Fianna Fáil. Burke later served a jail sentence for corruption including the Murphy bribe. Ahern has since taken a stance on the issue of political corruption in Ireland publicly calling for an outright ban of corporate and trade union donations to political parties.

In more recent times Ahern's religious beliefs have been questioned especially in the way that his religious ideology may influence his political standpoint.

Cabinet career

Minister for Social, Community and Family Affairs (1997–2002)
Following the 1997 general election, a Fianna Fáil-Progressive Democrats came to power, Ahern was appointed Minister for Community, Social and Family Affairs. As Social Affairs Minister Ahern also introduced the largest social welfare and pension increases in Irish history. He also achieved pension rights for Irish people who had emigrated from Ireland prior to 1953.

Minister for Communications, Marine and Natural Resources (2002–2004)
Following the return of the government at the 2002 general election, Ahern was appointed Minister for Communications, Marine and Natural Resources. In this post he was critical of the main telecommunications provider eircom. His Department introduced a system of Policy Directions to the telecoms regulator mandating, amongst other things, Flat Rate Internet Access. It also devised the Ireland's Broadband Action Plan which entailed the government building an alternative fibre infrastructure and co-location facilities. He sanctioned a reform package for public service broadcasting in Ireland and introduced a Charter for Ireland's national broadcaster RTÉ. His Department introduced a programme to provide free broadband internet access to schools. He secured EU recognition and protection of the Irish Box, an area of Irish territorial waters out of bounds to Spanish and Portuguese fishermen.

Minister for Foreign Affairs (2004–2008)
Following a cabinet reshuffle in 2004, Ahern became Minister for Foreign Affairs, the first Louth TD to hold that position since Frank Aiken in the 1960s. Shortly into his tenure in April 2005, Ahern was appointed one of four special envoys for United Nations reform by the UN Secretary General Kofi Annan.

Ahern spoke of the 'Third Phase' in Irish foreign policy which he calls "Active Neutrality". This is a vision of non-aligned Ireland taking up its international responsibilities by acting as a bridge between the developed and developing world, and by acting as a world leader in conflict and disasters. In this regard he took an extremely outspoken line on the crisis in Darfur, calling on the international community to 'wake up to the reality of rape, murder and destruction in the region. More recently Ahern has announced the establishment of an Irish Volunteer Corps and a Rapid Response Corps which would harness existing expertise amongst the Irish public to assist in the developing world. He has stated that, in foreign policy terms, 'the single greatest, economic, environmental, geopolitical issue now facing us is climate change.'

As Foreign Minister, Ahern was heavily involved in the Northern Ireland peace process. In 2006, he and several government leaders met regarding peace talks for Northern Ireland. Ahern met with the Secretary of State for Northern Ireland Peter Hain, US Ambassador to Ireland James C. Kenny, US Ambassador to the United Kingdom Robert H. Tuttle, the leadership of each of the main political parties involved in the process for peace, as well as three United States Congress members, James T. Walsh, Brian Higgins, and Tim Murphy. At the time of the meeting, there was a confirmation announcement of the Irish Republican Army (IRA) weapons decommissioning.

Ahern voiced concern over the 2006 Lebanon War. A shipment of bombs being sent to Israel by the United States was banned using Irish airspace or airfields.

Like many others in his party, therefore, Ahern describes himself as a republican, and made an associated statement regarding his self-identification at the 2006 Seán Moylan commemoration in Cork. At the 2006 Moylan commemoration, Ahern was quoted, stating: "As an Irish Republican, my main personal and political goal is to live to see the unity of Ireland".

As Foreign Minister, he led a campaign to secure a path to permanent residency for the 25,000 to 50,000 undocumented Irish citizens resident in the United States. He also introduced free passports for Irish senior citizens and had called for a comprehensive ban on the use of cluster munitions. Ahern was the first government Minister to call for a constitutional referendum on the issues arising from the Supreme Court decision on statutory rape, five months before it became government policy.

Minister for Justice, Equality and Law Reform (2008–2011)
Ahern was appointed Minister for Justice, Equality and Law Reform on 7 May 2008, by the new Taoiseach Brian Cowen. On 29 April 2009, Ahern proposed a controversial amendment to the Defamation Bill adding the crime of blasphemy to the statute books.

The amendment was passed in the Dáil on 9 July 2009, with only an hour of the debate set aside for the bill, and was then narrowly passed by the Seanad the next day by walk-through vote, after being defeated in the initial electronic vote. This amendment has been criticised by many within the public sphere, free speech campaigners and some ministers of European Union member states. As of 2010, the law is in effect.

Ahern is responsible for the Civil Partnership Bill 2009 published on 26 June 2009.

He received the Murphy Report into child sexual abuse in the Dublin Diocese in June 2009. Most of the report was published on 26 November 2009 of that year, though parts were not, due to names that were undergoing prosecution.

As part of a reshuffle in March 2010, the Equality affairs section of the department was moved to the Department of Community, Equality and Gaeltacht Affairs.

Ahern said that in March 2010 he would propose to the Cabinet a constitutional amendment deleting the constitutional prohibition on blasphemy when the children's rights amendment comes up. Ahern was opposed to a stand-alone referendum that would have cost €3 or €4 million, his spokesman added. At the time, Ahern wrote in The Irish Times: "My intention is to remove the possibility of prison sentences and private prosecutions for blasphemy, currently provided for in Irish law. The only credible alternative to this move is a blasphemy referendum, which I consider, in the current circumstances, a costly and unwarranted diversion."

On 15 November 2010, he described as 'fiction' the speculation that Ireland was about to seek financial aid from the European Union.
He told RTÉ's The Week in Politics that 'nothing is going on at the direction of Government in relation to this.' On 21 November 2010, the Taoiseach Brian Cowen confirmed that Ireland had formally requested financial support from the European Union's European Financial Stability Facility and the International Monetary Fund.

Retirement
On 30 November 2010, he announced he will not contest his Dáil seat at the 2011 general election, as he has rheumatoid arthritis, and said it was a "painful medical condition necessitating heavy medication". He retires to a combined annual ministerial and TD's pension of €128,300. He resigned as Minister for Justice and Law Reform on 19 January 2011.

Comments during debate on decriminalisation of homosexuality
During the debate on decriminalisation of homosexuality in the Dáil in 1993, he agreed with a statement by Brendan McGahon which reads: "Homosexuality is a departure from normality and while homosexuals deserve our compassion they do not deserve our tolerance" and who described homosexuals as being "like lefthand drivers driving on the right-hand side of the road".

Ahern himself added: "Will we eventually see the day in this country when, as has happened in the USA, homosexuals will seek the right to adopt children? We should think seriously about this possibility". Following his appointment as Minister responsible for equality, Ahern refused to be drawn on the matter and did not give an answer as to whether he still held these opinions.

Civil partnership
Ahern was responsible for introducing legislation recognising civil partnerships for same-sex couples. He declared the legislation (Civil Partnership and Certain Rights and Obligations of Cohabitants Act 2010), which passed into law in July 2010, as "one of the most important pieces of civil rights legislation to be enacted since independence."

Controversy over Michael McKevitt

Dermot Ahern denied claims that he had made representations to former Minister for Justice Michael McDowell on behalf of Michael McKevitt, who has been convicted of directing terrorism. He said that had merely forwarded an email from McKevitts' wife, Bernadette Sands McKevitt, who was a constituent in 2004.

References

 

1955 births
Living people
Alumni of University College Dublin
Fianna Fáil TDs
Irish windsurfers
Local councillors in County Louth
Members of the 25th Dáil
Members of the 26th Dáil
Members of the 27th Dáil
Members of the 28th Dáil
Members of the 29th Dáil
Members of the 30th Dáil
Ministers for Foreign Affairs (Ireland)
Ministers for Justice (Ireland)
Ministers for Social Affairs (Ireland)
Ministers of State of the 26th Dáil
People from Drogheda
Government Chief Whip (Ireland)
People educated at St Mary's College, Dundalk